Yousef S. Taha (born July 8, 1988) is a Filipino-Palestinian professional basketball player for the Blackwater Bossing of the Philippine Basketball Association (PBA). He was selected 11th overall in the 2012 PBA draft by the Air21 Express.

Professional career
In the middle of the 2012–13 Philippine Cup, Taha was traded from the Air21 to Ginebra. Then before the 2013 Governors' Cup, Taha was again traded, this time to the GlobalPort Batang Pier. Petron Blaze Boosters, got him in a trade with the Batang Pier which gave them the Blaze Boosters' 5th overall pick in 2013 PBA draft In the middle of 2014 PBA Commissioner's Cup playoffs which San Miguel Beermen is eliminated by Air21 Express, Taha was again traded to GlobalPort Batang Pier in exchange for Justin Chua and he will make return in GlobalPort. On June 4, 2014 Taha was again traded by GlobalPort Batang Pier to San Mig Super Coffee Mixers in exchange for Yancy De Ocampo and Val Acuña.

On November 28, 2016, Taha announced on a letter that he will be going back to his hometown country of Kuwait for personal reasons, thus ending his short career in the PBA. The leave was only for a short while, however, as he returned to the Philippines to play with the team again in 2017–18 PBA season. On November 29, 2017, exactly a year and a day after his "retirement", he officially signed a two-year contract with GlobalPort.

On April 3, 2018, Taha, along with Terrence Romeo, was traded to the TNT KaTropa for Moala Tautuaa and two future draft picks.

On February 19, 2021, he signed a one-year deal with the Alaska Aces. Exactly one year later, he signed a one-year extension with the team.

On May 21, 2022, Taha was traded to the Blackwater Bossing for Kurt Lojera. Two days after, he signed a one-year extension with the team.

PBA career statistics

As of the end of 2022–23 season

Season-by-season averages

|-
| align=left rowspan=3| 
| align=left | Air21
| rowspan=3|37 || rowspan=3|11.7 || rowspan=3|.341 || rowspan=3|– || rowspan=3|.522 || rowspan=3|4.1 || rowspan=3|.7 || rowspan=3|.3 || rowspan=3|.4 || rowspan=3|2.5
|-
| align=left | Barangay Ginebra
|-
| align=left | GlobalPort
|-
| align=left rowspan=3| 
| align=left | Petron / San Miguel
| rowspan=3|23 || rowspan=3| 8.8 || rowspan=3|.400 || rowspan=3|– || rowspan=3|.611 || rowspan=3|2.1 || rowspan=3|.4 || rowspan=3|.2 || rowspan=3|.2 || rowspan=3|1.9 
|-
| align=left | GlobalPort
|-
| align=left | San Mig Super Coffee
|-
| align=left | 
| align=left | Purefoods / Star
| 31 ||	15.1 || .500 || .000 || .560 || 4.2 || .9 || .3 || .5 || 4.2 
|-
| align=left rowspan=2| 
| align=left | Star
| rowspan=2|23 || rowspan=2|18.9 || rowspan=2|.525 || rowspan=2|– || rowspan=2|.500 || rowspan=2|6.0 || rowspan=2|.9 || rowspan=2|.4 || rowspan=2|.3 ||rowspan=2| 4.5
|-
| align=left | GlobalPort
|-
| align=left rowspan=2| 
| align=left | GlobalPort
| rowspan=2|20 || rowspan=2|11.5 || rowspan=2|.466 || rowspan=2|.200 || rowspan=2|.533 || rowspan=2|3.4 || rowspan=2|.5 || rowspan=2|.2 || rowspan=2|.3 || rowspan=2|3.2
|-
| align=left | TNT
|-
| align=left | 
| align=left | TNT
| 40 || 12.4 || .429 || .000 || .540 || 3.4 || .6 || .3 || .4 || 3.2
|-
| align=left | 
| align=left | Alaska
| 16 || 23.2 || .471 || .500 || .620 || 6.4 || 1.5 || .6 || .8 || 8.1
|-
| align=left | 
| align=left | Blackwater
| 30 || 18.5 || .465 || .000 || .538 || 5.9 || 1.8 || .4 || .6 || 6.6
|-class=sortbottom
| align="center" colspan=2 | Career
| 220 || 14.5 || .453 || .100 || .549 || 4.3 || .9 || .3 || .4 || 4.0

References

1988 births
Living people
Air21 Express players
Barako Bull Energy players
Barangay Ginebra San Miguel players
Centers (basketball)
Filipino men's basketball players
Filipino people of Palestinian descent
NorthPort Batang Pier players
Kuwaiti emigrants to the Philippines
Mapúa Cardinals basketball players
San Miguel Beermen players
Magnolia Hotshots players
Air21 Express draft picks
Alaska Aces (PBA) players
Blackwater Bossing players